The Battle of Chora took place in and around the town of Chora (3,000 inhabitants), in Afghanistan's Uruzgan Province, from June 15 to 19, 2007. The fighting was between ISAF and Afghan forces on one side and Taliban forces on the other, for the control of the Chora District center, regarded by the Taliban as a tactical target because it provides ground access from unsecured Gizab District in the north to the provincial capital of Tarinkot. According to some press reports, the fighting was the largest Taliban offensive of 2007 in Afghanistan, and resulted in the death of one American, two Dutch, and 16 Afghan soldiers, as well as approximately 58 civilians and 71 Taliban fighters.

Prelude
Uruzgan Province, along with neighboring Kandahar and Helmand provinces in southern Afghanistan, is part of the Taliban's traditional Pashtun tribal stronghold. In Uruzgan, NATO's ISAF mission took over authority for Afghanistan from the U.S.-led coalition in August 2006, resulting in 1,400 Dutch soldiers replacing some 150 U.S. troops at the Provincial Reconstruction Team (PRT) in Uruzgan's provincial capital, Tarinkot, and other bases. In addition to co-located Afghan battalions, there was an Australian element under Dutch command and contributions from other NATO allies. Uruzgan is 2/3 the size of the Netherlands, but the Dutch presence has been challenged with providing security to areas it patrols regularly. When faced with the security challenge, the Dutch reverted to an "inkspot policy" whereby they focused their attention only on Uruzgan's three population centers, leaving other areas to Taliban control.

Dutch activities included setting up checkpoints, some of which were near the town of Chora. At the time, there were 100 Afghan police in Chora.

Dutch troops were working in Chora on projects such as a school, a mosque, and a bridge, following up on civilian construction projects initiated by the U.S. 60 Dutch troops were deployed in Chora.

Battle

June 15
On Friday evening, June 15, there was some shooting near Chora.
That morning, a Dutch convoy in Tarinkot had been attacked by a suicide bomber, killing a Dutch soldier, Timo Smeehuijzen, and several Afghan civilians.

June 16
A U.S. A-10 Thunderbolt II spotted a group of 60 persons moving toward Chora. Dutch troops at Chora were informed, but the A-10 did not engage the group, due to uncertainty over their identity and intentions.

Shortly after, three Afghan police posts (Kala Kala, Nyazi, and Sarab), on the road linking Chora to Tarinkot came under coordinated attack by a large number of Taliban fighters (the Dutch press claim "800" men, although this number seems impossibly large and cannot be verified). Dutch troops in Chora moved to support the Kala Kala and Nyazi Afghan police posts.

The Taliban captured Sarab police post, killing two brothers of the commander of the post. They also cut off the hands of the wife of a captured policeman, who was forced to watch her mutilation before being beheaded himself. That afternoon, the Dutch withdrew from the Kala Kala and Nyazi checkpoints, allowing the Taliban to capture these posts as well.

The Dutch troops reassembled near the Chora District building and contacted their commander, Colonel Hans van Griensven in Camp Holland at Multi National Base Tarin Kot near Tarinkot, for instructions. Griensven ordered them to stay and fight.

ISAF aircraft provided support and attacked the Taliban, scouts reported that 30 Taliban volunteers, led by individuals nicknamed Kaka and Sadam, were gathered inside a farm at the village of Qal'eh-ye Ragh. An Apache helicopter fired two Hellfire missiles at the farm, killing the Taliban fighters and civilians inside.

Rozi Khan, a local tribal militia leader with shifting loyalties (who was himself killed during October 2008 fighting in the area), offered 150–200 of his fighters to support the defense of Chora. The Dutch and the Chora village leaders accepted Khan's offer reluctantly as the village leaders had to arm Khan's fighters (aware that Khan might later change sides again and turn the weapons on them). A group of Dutch and Australian troops at Camp Holland near Tarinkot moved to Chora, commanded by Lieutenant Colonel Rob Querido. The Australian troops deployed in Baluchi Valley, between Tarinkot and Chora, to secure the key road.

Also on Saturday, June 16, U.S. Staff Sergeant Roy P. Lewsader was killed when his vehicle was struck by a rocket-propelled grenade in Tarinkot.

June 17–18
On Sunday, June 17, and Monday, June 18, Dutch reinforcements arrived from Camp Holland and a second Dutch base in Deh Rahwod, increasing the number of Dutch troops at Chora to 500.
50 Afghan National Army reinforcements also arrived in Chinook helicopters. Taliban fighters, who had gained control of most of the residential areas, forced civilians to fight with them or face execution. The Taliban also used civilian homes as shelter, but were still attacked by NATO aircraft, causing civilian casualties. As the fighting continued, many Taliban fighters were killed.

At one time, six Dutch F-16s were in the air, engaging ground targets assigned by the infantry.

On the night of Sunday, June 17, to the morning of Monday, June 18, during the loading of an L16 81mm mortar, which was deployed in the courtyard of the Chora District government building, a round exploded inside the launch tube, killing Dutch Sergeant-Major Jos Leunissen and wounding three other Dutch soldiers.

June 19
At 9:30 a.m., NATO briefly withdrew the aircraft supporting the fighting at Chora, but air support was restored at 9:40 when Col. van Griensven reportedly threatened to withdraw the six Dutch F-16s from NATO command.

At 10:00, Dutch and Afghan troops, together with Rozi Khan's militia, made a push called "Operation Troy", in which they recaptured the three lost checkpoints.

References

External links

2007 in Afghanistan
Battles of the War in Afghanistan (2001–2021)
Battles of the War in Afghanistan (2001–2021) involving Australia
Battles of the War in Afghanistan (2001–2021) involving the Netherlands
Battles of the War in Afghanistan (2001–2021) involving the United States
Conflicts in 2007
History of Urozgan Province
June 2007 events in Asia
NATO operations in Afghanistan
Battles in 2007